Clamdigger may refer to:

 One who engages in clam digging
 Clamdigger (de Kooning), a bronze sculpture by Willem de Kooning
 Clamdigger (train), a discontinued commuter train in Connecticut, US
 Clamdiggers or capri pants, a three-quarter length pants style